Greece is set to participate in the Eurovision Song Contest 2023 in Liverpool, United Kingdom. The Greek broadcaster Hellenic Broadcasting Corporation (ERT) internally selected Victor Vernicos to represent the country with the song "What They Say", which he composed himself. Vernicos was announced as the artist on 30 January, while the song was presented to the public on 12 March.

Background 

Between 2004 and 2013, the nation achieved nine top ten placements in the final. -entrant Argo with their song "Utopian Land" failed to qualify the nation to the final for the first time ever, marking Greece's worst result at the contest and leading to their absence from the final for the first time since 2000; a contest in which they did not compete.

The Greek national broadcaster, Hellenic Broadcasting Corporation (ERT), broadcasts the event within Greece and organises the selection process for the nation's entry. ERT had been in charge of Greece's participation in the contest since their debut in 1974 until 2013 when the broadcaster was shut down by a government directive and replaced firstly with the interim  (DT) and then later by the New Hellenic Radio, Internet and Television (NERIT) broadcaster. Following the victory of the  party at the January 2015 Greek legislative election, the Hellenic Parliament re-instated ERT as the public Greek broadcaster by the renaming of NERIT as ERT, which began broadcasting in June 2015. ERT confirmed their intentions to participate at the 2023 Eurovision Song Contest on 26 August 2022.

Before Eurovision

Internal selection 

On 26 August 2022, ERT opened a submission period where artists and composers were able to submit their proposals for consideration by the broadcaster until 9 October 2022. Artists were required to be signed to record labels and their proposal had to contain up to three songs, indicate the accompanying artistic group and include ideas or concepts for the song's promotion and presentation. 106 songs were received by the submission deadline. Seven entries were then shortlisted by a seven-member artistic committee and were announced on 28 December 2022. ERT's artistic committee consisted of Petros Adam (music producer), Leonidas Antonopoulos (journalist and music producer), Fotis Apergis (ERT radio director), Konstantinos Bourounis (head of ERT's youth program), Maria Kozakou (director of the Second Programme of Hellenic Radio), Dimitris Papadimitriou (music composer) and Yannis Petridis, (music producer).

First round
The seven acts were then evaluated by a public committee consisting of a total of 70 members randomly selected from 2,982 applications based on five age groups: 25 members in the 18 to 24 category, 20 members in the 25 to 34 category, 15 members in the 35 to 44 category and 10 members in the over 45 category. On 19 January 2023, ERT shortlisted three final songs from the seven, which was the outcome of the public committee vote, followed by a respective evaluation by the artistic committee.  The final three were announced through ERT1 show, Proian se eidon tin mesimvrian.

Second round
The combination of votes from the public committee (50.6%) and the artistic committee (49.4%) then selected the Greek entry. This marked the first time that ERT had opted for a format where the entry was selected by two panels. Greek-Danish singer Victor Vernicos was announced as the Greek representative for the 2023 contest through ERT1's newscast on 30 January 2023. His entry, "What They Say", was released on 12 March 2023.

Reception and legal challenge
Following the announcement of Vernicos as the Greek entrant, Mantzoukis publicly protested the results of the process, threatening legal action. Mantzoukis and her legal team cited two concerns in their challenge of the results. Prior to the artistic committee's vote, it was reported that Kaouri and Maragkou had withdrawn themselves from consideration, leaving only two entrants as options. Despite this, all three acts were awarded points by the committee. Secondly, they alleged that even if all three acts were considered, the point values awarded do not sum to the quantity of points available, and if they had, Mantzoukis would have won. Artistic committee member Kozakou then explained in an interview on ERT's Proian se eidon tin mesimvrian that point values were not awarded based on awards of first, second and third place by the committee (12, 10 or 8 points, respectively, in Eurovision fashion), but from 12 through 4 points (first through seventh) to align the total point values with the quantity awarded by the public committee. Mantzoukis' lawyer Christos Zotiadis responded during an interview on Star Channel's show Breakfast @ Star that they were unsatisfied with ERT's response, and requested that the detailed committee votes for each member at each voting stage be released for transparency. 

A temporary injunction halting the Greek participation was denied by Greek courts on 6 March, citing the short time period between then and the EBU's 13 March deadline for entry submissions. Mantzoukis' lawsuit to be declared the winner and awarded damages is anticipated to be heard in mid-May following the contest.

Promotion
To promote the entry, a music video of the song, directed by Yiannis Georgioudakis, was filmed. It was scheduled to be released on 6 March alongside the song itself, but was delayed due to the Tempi train crash. The song and video were eventually released on 12 March through ERT's over-the-top media service ERTFLIX.

At Eurovision 
According to Eurovision rules, all nations with the exceptions of the host country and the "Big Five" (France, Germany, Italy, Spain and the United Kingdom) are required to qualify from one of two semi-finals in order to compete for the final; the top 10 countries from each semi-final progress to the final. The European Broadcasting Union (EBU) split up the competing countries into six different pots based on voting patterns from previous contests, with countries with favourable voting histories put into the same pot. On 31 January 2023, an allocation draw was held, which placed each country into one of the two semi-finals, and determined which half of the show they would perform in. Greece has been placed into the second semi-final, to be held on 11 May 2023, and has been scheduled to perform in the first half of the show. In Greece, all shows will be broadcast on ERT, with commentary by Maria Kozakou and Jenny Melita.

Konstantinos Rigos was hired as the artistic director for the entry, responsible for its stage presence.

References 

2023
Countries in the Eurovision Song Contest 2023
Eurovision